Jacques Rispal (1 August 1923 – 9 February 1986) was a French film actor. He appeared in 100 films between 1952 and 1986.

Selected filmography

 Crimson Curtain (1952)
 A Man Named Rocca (1961) - (uncredited)
 Five Miles to Midnight (1962)
 Graduation Year (1964) - Le prof Cachou
 Aimez-vous les femmes ? (1964) - Maley
 L'Âge ingrat (1964) - Brunin - le boulanger (uncredited)
 The War Is Over (1966) - Manolo
 Who Are You, Polly Maggoo? (1966)
 Si j'étais un espion (1967)
 Tante Zita (1968) - Le sergent
 L'écume des jours (1968)
 Stolen Kisses (1968) - Monsieur Colin
 The Milky Way (1969)
 The Uninvited (1969) - Le boulanger
 The Confession (1970) - L'ancien secrétaire
 Bed and Board (1970) - Monsieur Desbois
 Ils (1970) - L'employé du fisc
 Le portrait de Marianne (1971) - Karl Prinzman
 Le Chat (1971) - Le docteur
 Le Prussien (1971, TV Movie) - Auguste
 La nuit bulgare (1972)
 Le soldat Laforêt (1972) - Gillorgues
 The Discreet Charm of the Bourgeoisie (1972) - Gendarme
 Les caïds (1972)
 La Scoumoune (1972) - M. Dubois, le concessionnaire de cercueils
 The Dominici Affair (1973) - Paul Maillet
 The Invitation (1973) - René Mermet
 Na! (1973) - Imbert (uncredited)
 Le mataf (1973) - L'infirmier
 Two Men in Town (1973) - Le juge (uncredited)
 The Train (1973) - L' employé de l'état civil
 Lacombe, Lucien (1974) - M. Laborit
 Par le sang des autres (1974)
 Going Places (1974) - Watchman at the Mammouth Store
 On s'est trompé d'histoire d'amour (1974) - M. Dalmart, le beau-père d'Anne
 Un nuage entre les dents (1974) - L'homme chauve
 France société anonyme (1974)
 Les guichets du Louvre (1974)
 Fear Over the City (1975) - Cacahuète
 Act of Aggression (1975) - Raoul Dumouriez
 Section spéciale (1975) - Abraham Trzebrucki
 Cher Victor (1975) - Charret
 Il faut vivre dangereusement (1975) - Le régisseur du cabaret
 Le chant du départ (1975) - Guitton
 The Gypsy (1975) - Docteur J. Weiss, le vétérinaire
 The French Detective (1975) - Mercier
 Calmos (1976) - L'assassin
 L'affiche rouge (1976) - Abraham
 Boomerang (1976) - Albert Chiusi
 Les Ambassadeurs (1976) - M. Pierre, le concierge
 La bulle (1976) - Le père de Lola
 Comme la lune (1977) - Emile Rabu
 La Menace (1977) - Paco, Trucks Dispatcher
 Le mille-pattes fait des claquettes (1977) - Le paysan
 Peppermint Soda (1977) - Le concierge du Lycée
 Pourquoi pas! (1977) - Le père de Louis
 The Recourse to the Method (1978)
 The Adolescent (1979) - M. Jardin
 La ville à prendre (1979)
 French Postcards (1979)
 Les turlupins (1980) - Loin du Ciel
 My American Uncle (1980) - L'homme bousculé par René
 Pour la peau d'un flic (1981) - Professeur Bachhoffer
 Beau-père (1981) - Le chauffeur de taxi
 Lucie sur Seine (1982) - Le garagiste
 Vive la sociale! (1983) - Directeur du préventorium
 Le thé à la menthe (1984) - Le clochard raciste

External links

1923 births
1986 deaths
French male film actors
20th-century French male actors